Texas Rangers is a 2001 American action Western film directed by Steve Miner and starring James Van Der Beek, Ashton Kutcher, Alfred Molina, and Dylan McDermott. It follows a group of Texas Rangers in the post-American Civil War era. The film is very loosely based upon the book Taming the Nueces Strip by George Durham, who based it on his own experiences serving in Captain Leander McNelly's Texas Ranger group as a young man. The film was panned by critics and was a box office bomb.

Plot 
Ten years after the Civil War, the Governor of Texas asks Leander McNelly to recommission a company of Rangers to help uphold the law along the Mexican border. In a town, Lincoln Rogers Dunnison arrives by carriage to meet his family.  Just as they are reunited, John King Fisher and his gang arrive and kill several townspeople, including Lincoln's family, then steal cattle which are to be auctioned. After the attack, Lincoln wanders into an abandoned church and meets George Durham, a fellow survivor. George joins Lincoln on his way to Brownsville to join the Texas Rangers.

In Brownsville, Lincoln witnesses a man attempting to extort resources from the town to support his posse which will supposedly pursue Fisher's gang. McNelly arrives with the legitimate Rangers and is forced to kill the man, but invites any others to join the Rangers. Despite his ineptitude with weapons and not being from Texas, Lincoln shows determination to fight for justice and is accepted into the Rangers along with George and others.  McNelly uses Lincoln as his secretary because of his education and reveals that he is dying, apparently of tuberculosis. Out on the trail, Fisher and his gang encounter a traveling circus and kidnap a beautiful Spanish woman.

After training in the field, a Ranger asks Lincoln to get him an appointment with McNelly because he wants to make better maps of the ill-charted Texas territory.  Once in his tent, he reveals himself to be a Union assassin who wants to kill McNelly for Confederate crimes.  McNelly kills the man, but Lincoln is shaken and tries to desert, believing himself responsible for endangering McNelly.  McNelly convinces Lincoln to stay.

The Rangers get their first taste of combat against a small contingent and take two prisoners.  Despite initially saying that anyone who surrendered would be tried, McNelly hangs the two survivors. Lincoln is offended by this apparent lack of justice.  Later, when the Rangers catch up with the bulk of Fisher's gang, McNelly decides to attack despite the protests of his sergeants. The battle goes horribly as Fisher planned an ambush and several Rangers die. McNelly collects his survivors, including the Spanish girl, and heads for his friend Richard Dukes' ranch.

At the ranch, Lincoln and George compete for Caroline Dukes' affection and Sergeant Armstrong learns from the Spanish girl that Fisher is planning to raid Logan's ranch for cattle. The Rangers ride out, but when no raid occurs, McNelly realizes that the girl lied, and Fisher must be headed to Dukes' ranch. The Rangers discover that Dukes has been captured and Fisher has crossed the Rio Grande into Mexico. After pleading for her life as a victim, Lincoln convinces McNelly to do justice and release the girl. The Rangers then plot their attack on the Mexican fortress after McNelly dictates his will to Lincoln, in which he leaves him his possessions and effectively instates him as leader of the Rangers upon his death.

The Rangers attack the fort at dawn; the Fisher gang are asleep and hungover and are overpowered. Despite having men get behind the attacking Rangers through underground tunnels, the gang is defeated when Sergeant Bones captures a Gatling gun to use against them. Lincoln avenges his family by killing Fisher and saves McNelly's life in doing so. After the Rangers return to Dukes' ranch, McNelly implores Lincoln and George to keep the Rangers on the right side of justice with his dying breath. George stays behind with Caroline to work on the ranch and Lincoln rides off to lead the Rangers.

Cast

Production 
The film's source was the book Taming of the Neuces Strip: The Story of McNelly's Rangers by George Durham.

In 1989, Frank Price at Columbia optioned a story idea called Ranger from Scott Busby and Martin Copland based on the book A Texas Ranger by N. A. Jennings. Busby and Copland were hired to do the adaptation. A year later John Milius was on the project. He wrote several drafts and was going to direct for Columbia, then Savoy Pictures.

In 1992 Milius said he hoped to make the film with a young cast for $15–17 million, which is "very reasonable today", he said:
It's very easy to make Westerns. Most of the people making decisions today are idiots who've probably never seen one, city-born people who feel that the here and now is most important. They don't like historical films of any kind, especially Westerns. Sci-fi is acceptable but history is not hip. Part of being modern is that anything from the past is dead. We live in an historical age. An enormous amount of people were interested in TV's The Civil War and Lonesome Dove--which Hollywood writes off as the great unwashed between the coasts. We're the only culture in history that builds a shrine and prostrates before the 14-year-old.
Milius added: "The best Westerns were love poems to this country, made by people in love with the country physically. John Ford photographed the country the way you photograph a woman. He photographed the open spaces, gray clouds, light, red earth, trees, really sensuously. The country was the repository of endless promise. Any good Western is about promise".

Milius says he "got pretty close to making the film but they wouldn’t approve Tommy Lee Jones as the star, so I left it to go do Vikings [a film that ultimately was not made]. Another guy worked on it, the script was rewritten, but they were never able to get it made. They couldn’t attract the cast they wanted. So now these other characters [Bob and Harvey Weinstein] bought it".

The film did not begin production until 1999. It was made by Miramax, who cast some young teen idols in the lead, including James Van Der Beek from Varsity Blues. Milius was replaced as director, and screenwriter Ehren Kruger was hired to do a rewrite on Milius's script.

Milius commented that "it was one of my best scripts, and I wasn't willing to sit there and proceed to dismantle it. Youth today have a sense of rightful entitlement. Their idea of great adventure is diving off bridges with bungee cords. They don't go and do something real-they're all interested in looking good and getting that BMW".

Milius said the Weinsteins "were really arrogant. They called me up and acted as if I should feel privileged to come back and ruin my own work. I told that asshole Bob Weinstein he was lucky to have it the way it was".

While filmed in 1999, the film was not released until 2001. Both Milius and Kruger were not credited on the final film.

The film is loosely based on the activities of Leander H. McNelly and the Special Force of the Texas Rangers, but it takes considerable liberties with the historical record (McNelly is shown dying of tuberculosis shortly after the climax of the action, when in real life he had retired from the Rangers the year before; John King Fisher was not actually killed by the Rangers, but came to an agreement with them).

Release

Box office 
Texas Rangers was a box office bomb, earning only $763,740 on a budget of $38 million.

Reception 
Texas Rangers was panned by critics. On Rotten Tomatoes, the film has an approval rating of 2%, based on reviews from 51 critics. The website's consensus reads: "As far as westerns go, Texas Rangers is strictly mediocre stuff." On Metacritic, the film has a score of 29 out of 100, based on 10 reviews, indicating "generally unfavorable reviews".

John Milius claimed that Miramax "mutilated" his script: "They don't have any sense of responsibility. They'd make a film about anything if they thought it would make some money for them. I think they should give Harvey Weinstein [president of Miramax] to the Taliban. I'd like to see him on the other side. I'd like to hunt him down in a cave".

References

External links 
 
 
 Review of film at Los Angeles Times

2001 films
2001 Western (genre) films
American Civil War films
2000s English-language films
Films about the Texas Ranger Division
Films directed by Steve Miner
American adventure drama films
Films set in Texas
Films scored by Trevor Rabin
Miramax films
Dimension Films films
2000s American films